The House Subcommittee on Innovation, Data and Commerce is a subcommittee within the United States House Committee on Energy and Commerce. The subcommittee was known as the Subcommittee on Consumer Protection and Commerce until the 118th Congress, when data policy was transferred to it from the Subcommittee on Communications and Technology.

Jurisdiction
The committee has jurisdiction over issues affecting interstate and foreign commerce, including all trade matters within the jurisdiction of the full committee; regulation of commercial practices at the Federal Trade Commission, including sports-related matters; consumer affairs and consumer protection, including privacy matters generally; consumer product safety at the Consumer Product Safety Commission; product liability; and motor vehicle safety; Regulation of travel, tourism, and time. Within these specific areas, the committee also has jurisdiction over all aspects related to Homeland security, including cybersecurity.

Members, 118th Congress

Historical membership rosters

117th Congress

116th Congress

115th Congress

References

External links
Official Homepage 

Energy Commerce, Manufacturing and Trade
Parliamentary committees on International Trade